Typhoon Ruby, known in the Philippines as Typhoon Yoning, was a strong tropical cyclone that struck Hong Kong, Macau, and southern China in early September 1964. The precursor disturbance to Ruby was first identified on August 29 over the Philippine Sea, and this system organised into a tropical cyclone by September 1. Ruby intensified as it moved west, becoming a typhoon the next day and subsequently passing over the Babuyan Islands of the Philippines. After reaching the South China Sea, Ruby turned northwest and intensified further, attaining peak ten-minute sustained winds of  before making landfall at the peak intensity near Hong Kong on September 5. The typhoon weakened after moving inland and dissipated on September 6 over southeastern China.

Despite brushing Philippines as a typhoon, no impacts were recorded. Ruby was one of the strongest typhoons to hit Hong Kong in the city's history. The storm sank 314 fishing vessels and destroyed or damaged thousands of homes. Rain-triggered landslides and wind-blown debris caused 300 injuries. Among locales in Hong Kong, Tai Po was most seriously affected. A total of 38 fatalities were attributed to Ruby in Hong Kong, though another 14 people remained unaccounted for. A wind gust of  generated by Ruby in Macau was the strongest gust measured there on record; at least 20 fatalities were reported in Macau. The typhoon caused serious flooding along the mouth of the Pearl River in Guangdong Province in South China, where at least 700 people were killed.

Meteorological history 

The genesis of Typhoon Ruby stemmed from the interaction of a trough of low pressure and a westward-propagating tropical wave. This interaction led to the formation of a wind circulation west of Saipan on August 29, 1964. It initially moved west-northwest before curving west. Nimbus 1, a weather satellite, was used to detect and locate this precursor disturbance 21 hours prior to investigation from aircraft reconnaissance. It became a severe tropical storm within 18 hours of tropical cyclogenesis according to data from the Hong Kong Observatory (known as the Royal Observatory in 1964). Data from the JTWC and HKO indicate Ruby became a typhoon by 12:00 UTC on September 2.

According to the Japan Meteorological Agency (JMA), Ruby's barometric pressure reached a minimum of 972 hPa (mbar; 28.70 inHg) during this time; this is disputed by the HKO and the China Meteorological Administration (CMA), which both analysed Ruby's pressure to have continued falling for at least two more days. While ship observations were scant in the northern South China Sea following the issuance of typhoon warnings, aircraft reconnaissance and satellite imagery provided data on Ruby's position and intensity as it approached Hong Kong, Macau, and the southeastern coast of China. The CMA and HKO both estimated Ruby's central atmospheric pressure bottomed out at 960 hPa (mbar; 28.35 inHg). Ruby made landfall near Hong Kong at peak intensity at around 09:00 UTC on September 5. Ruby weakened after moving inland, degenerating into a tropical storm by September 6 and dissipating inland over southeastern China later that day.

Preparations and impact 

Storm warnings were issued for northern Luzon and the Babuyan and Batanes islands on September 3. The Royal Observatory escalated these warnings as Ruby approached, with signal no. 3 issued at 18:35 UTC on September 4 and later signal no. 10 at 02:40 UTC on September 5; signal no. 10 was in effect for nearly four hours. As the storm passed, the signal severity decreased and the final signal was lifted at 04:50 UTC on September 5 after over 42 hours of active warnings. Ruby was the fifth typhoon to warrant the issuance of the no. 10 signal in Hong Kong since the inception of the modern tropical cyclone signal system in 1946 and the first two of these signals in 1964.

Ruby was the fourth tropical cyclone to enter the vicinity of Hong Kong in 1964, a year that featured a record amount of storms tracking near the Crown territory. Gale-force winds associated with Ruby reached Hong Kong on the morning of September 5 and continued to impact the Crown territory until the following night. A  gust on Waglan Island was the fastest observed in the island's history. Rainfall accumulations in Hong Kong reached at least  in 24 hours. The Royal Observatory recorded at least (165 mm) 6.50 in of rain from the storm.

There were 38 fatalities in Hong Kong associated with Ruby, though 14 others were never accounted for. Another 300 people were injured by the storm, and a total of 8,500 people were classified by the Royal Observatory as "disaster victims". Numerous injuries were caused by sheet metal torn from buildings under construction in downtown Hong Kong. Fifty thousand refugees from the People's Republic of China were rendered homeless. The typhoon destroyed or damaged 314 fishing vessels and 20 ships throughout the Hong Kong area. At least ten ships ran aground. Nine people were lost after a Panamanian freighter, the Dorar, sank in Victoria Harbour; 14 others were rescued. Kai Tak International Airport, ferry service, and other transportation systems were brought to a standstill throughout Hong Kong, in addition to the Hong Kong Stock Exchange. Roads were blocked by toppled trees and overturned cars. One road was obstructed by cranes that fell from a 20-storey building. Heavy rainfall caused by Ruby led to floods, landslides, and razed homes. High voltage electrical wires torn by the winds caused hundreds of fires before the power service was terminated. Tai Po was the hardest-hit area in Hong Kong; there, the storm destroyed thousands of village houses and temporary shelters. In Kowloon and Tsuen Wan, 1,368 houses were affected. A loosened boulder in Kowloon trapped ten people. At Mui Wo, 30 homes were destroyed and 180 others were unroofed. High waves pushed water into the Hong Kong City Hall, causing a delay in the 1964 Summer Olympics torch relay. Following the passage of Ruby, hundreds of workers cleared and repaired streets most seriously impacted in Hong Kong. The colonial government appealed for public donations for victims of Ruby on September 6. Hot meals and cash assistance were prepared for the displaced Chinese refugees in Hong Kong by government welfare groups.

A  wind gust in Taipa, Macau, set a new record for the fastest gust measured there; this record was later superseded by Typhoon Hato in 2017. The typhoon triggered a fire that destroyed a building there. Over 20 people were killed and 100 others were injured in Macau. "Severe flooding" occurred in Guangdong Province throughout the province and along the Pearl River delta. Many homes collapsed, and the damage there was the most severe since 1949. Xiangshan County was the hardest-hit region. More than 700 people were reportedly killed in Guangdong Province, including the unconfirmed deaths of 300 people following the collapse of a school dormitory. The devastation in Guangdong led to an increased influx of refugees fleeing the People's Republic of China for Hong Kong.

See also 

 Typhoon Wanda (1962)
 Typhoon Hope (1979)
 Typhoon Rose (1971)
 Typhoon Kent (1995)

Notes

References

Further reading 
 
 

1964 Pacific typhoon season
Typhoons in Hong Kong
Typhoons in Macau
Typhoons in the Philippines
Typhoons in China
Typhoons